Clifton Hill railway station is the junction for the Mernda and Hurstbridge lines in Victoria, Australia. It serves the north-eastern Melbourne suburb of Clifton Hill, and it opened on 8 May 1888.

Immediately to the north of the station, the Mernda and Hurstbridge lines diverge.

History

Clifton Hill station opened on 8 May 1888, when a railway line between Collingwood and Heidelberg was provided. Like the suburb itself, the station was named after the farm "Clifton", which was named in 1841 by early landowner John Docker. Land speculator John Knipe later named the area Clifton Hill.

In December 1981, the station building was damaged by fire, although the heritage-registered verandah escaped serious damage. In 1990, the station was renovated, with a matching verandah built on the western platform (Platform 2). In 1992, boom barriers replaced interlocked gates at the Ramsden Street level crossing, located nearby in the Up direction of the station. Signal boxes "A" and "B" were also abolished in May of that year, with semaphore signals replaced by coloured light signals. On 25 June 1996, Clifton Hill was upgraded to a Premium Station.

Clifton Hill is listed on the Register of the National Estate as an intact example of a Victorian Tudor-style suburban railway station, and is one of eleven that were originally built between 1887–1889. It is the only example that still retains the original corrugated iron wings on either side of the main building. The timber verandah on the eastern platform (Platform 1) is also considered architecturally rare. Other features of the complex include two timber-framed gabled roofed signal boxes (built in 1888 and 1901), located on either side of Platform 2, and the original swinging railway gates (out of use since 1992). One signal box was for the operation of the former level crossing gates across Heidelberg Road, which was replaced by an overpass in 1957. The other signal box controlled the level crossing gates at Ramsden Street.

Clifton Hill was once part of the Inner Circle line. The Hurstbridge line, between Clifton Hill and Westgarth, was duplicated in 2008–2009, and included a second bridge over the Merri Creek. On 27 January 2009, it was opened by former Premier, John Brumby, and former Transport Minister, Lynne Kosky.

In the early hours of 25 December 2011, a corrugated iron extension to the Platform 2 station building was damaged by fire. By 12 January 2012, the extension was demolished and removed.

Platforms and services

Clifton Hill has two side platforms, connected by an underpass. Platform 1 contains an enclosed waiting area, while Platform 2 contains a semi-enclosed waiting area and toilets.

The station is serviced by Metro Trains' Mernda and Hurstbridge line services.

Platform 1:
  all stations and limited express services to Flinders Street
  all stations and limited express services to Flinders Street

Platform 2:
  all stations services to Mernda
  all stations and limited express services to Macleod, Greensborough, Eltham and Hurstbridge

Transport links

Dysons operates two routes via Clifton Hill station, under contract to Public Transport Victoria:
 : to Moonee Ponds Junction
 : Heidelberg station – University of Melbourne (off-peak extension to Queen Victoria Market)

Kinetic Melbourne operates one route via Clifton Hill station, under contract to Public Transport Victoria:
 : Elsternwick station – Clifton Hill

References

External links
 
 Melway map

Heritage-listed buildings in Melbourne
Listed railway stations in Australia
Premium Melbourne railway stations
Railway stations in Melbourne
Railway stations in Australia opened in 1888
Railway stations in the City of Yarra